Established in 2004, the University of Applied Management (UAM) is a private, state-approved and fee-based university in Bavaria. The headquarters is located in Ismaning. The for-profit university also has campuses in Neumarkt, Berlin, Treuchtlingen, Unna and Accra.

University and study concept 

The UAM follows a semi virtual study concept. The majority of the study takes place virtually by using a modern online learning and communication platform. In addition, three attendance phases are provided per semester at a distance of about eight weeks. The presence phases last five days and serve to attend lectures and courses, and in order to take examinations. During the virtual phases the students use multimedia based work equipment to acquire the knowledge. The teaching methods are based on a blended learning approach and aim at a problem-based learning, which increases the learning success and problem-solving skills, and also encourages the transfer of theory into practice. The University of Applied Management also offers business services, for example in its role as a corporate university or by offering cooperation in the context of dual degree programmes. In addition, market-based services such as market analysis and monitorings are offered. The course contents are very practically oriented which is reflected in practical exercises and case studies in the context of the examinations. The university cooperates tightly with enterprises and associations in order to integrate the latest business and market trends into its curriculum. The Privatuniversity Castle Seeburg and the H:G University of Health and Sports, Technique and Art are to affiliated universities that also rely on the semi virtual study approach.

Degree programmes and main focus 
Depending on the course the academic degrees Bachelor of Arts, Master of Arts, Bachelor of Laws and Master of Laws can be achieved. The following study programmes are offered:

Business administration Bachelor of Arts (B.A.) with the specializations/industrial focuses
Strategic Management & Market-oriented Management
Controlling & Finance
Organization Management & Personnel Management
Intercultural Management
Public Management
Music Management & Cultural management
Real Estate & Construction Management
Marketing & Media Management
Commercial Management & E-commerce
Tourism & Hotel Management
Online Marketing
Taxes
Event Management
Founding Management
Business Administration Master of Arts (M.A.) with specializations/industrial focuses
International Management
International Accounting
HR & Health Management
Media & Online Marketing
Business Psychology Bachelor of Arts (B.A.) with specializations/industrial focuses
Organizational Psychology
Marketing Psychology & Advertising Psychology
Human Resources Development & Training
Communication & Advertising
Business Psychology Master of Arts (M.A.) with specializations/industrial focuses
Marketing Psychology & Advertising Psychology
Leadership & Change Management
Business Coaching & Consulting
Sports Management Bachelor of Arts (B.A.) with specializations/industrial focuses
Marketing Management in Sports
Club, Association & Sports Facility Management
Outdoor Sports & Adventure Management
Event Management
Sport Management Master of Arts (M.A.) with specializations/industrial focuses
Event Management
Sport Management
International Adventure Management
Business Laws Bachelor of Laws (LL.B.) with the specializations
Business Law
Tax law
Law of Public Administration
International Business Law
Business Laws Master of Laws (LL.M.) with the specializations
Leasing
International Contracts
Real Estate Law

Accreditation 
The University of Applied Management has successfully passed the institutional accreditation. All Bachelor and master's degree programmes have been accredited in the context of the implementation of the Bologna Process under the ECTS system by FIBAA. A quality management system consisting of external experts and internal evaluations of students ensures the high quality of the study programmes. The university seeks for a leading position in their chosen management disciplines.

Partners 
The University of Applied Management is cooperating with the Ludwig-Maximilians University of Munich and the University of Erlangen-Nuremberg. Lasting partnerships also exist with:

AutoScout24
FC Ingolstadt 04
Hagebaumarkt
Hannover 96
Hubert Burda Media
Jochen Schweizer
Max Bögl
Onpage.org
ProSiebenSat1
Rewe
City Administration of Munich
Sport Scheck

References 

2004 establishments in Germany
Educational institutions established in 2004
Buildings and structures in Erding (district)
Universities and colleges in Bavaria
Private universities and colleges in Germany